Watt is the fifth studio album by the English blues rock band Ten Years After, released in 1970. It was recorded in September 1970 except for the last track, a cover of Chuck Berry's "Sweet Little Sixteen", which is a recording from the 1970 Isle of Wight Festival.

Reception

Allmusic gave Watt a moderately negative review, saying it "had many of the same ingredients as its predecessor, Cricklewood Green, but wasn't nearly as well thought out." They praised the band for performing as energetically as ever, but contended that Alvin Lee's compositions for the album are uniformly uninspired.

Track listing
All songs written by Alvin Lee, unless otherwise noted.

Side One
"I'm Coming On" – 3:44
"My Baby Left Me" – 5:21
"Think About the Times" – 4:36
"I Say Yeah" – 5:14

Side Two
"The Band with No Name" – 1:34
"Gonna Run" – 5:57
"She Lies in the Morning" – 7:19
"Sweet Little Sixteen" (live) (Chuck Berry) – 4:07

Charts

Personnel
Ten Years After
Alvin Lee – guitar, vocals
Leo Lyons – bass
Ric Lee – drums
Chick Churchill – organ
Technical
Chris Kimsey - engineer

References

1970 albums
Ten Years After albums
Chrysalis Records albums
Deram Records albums
Albums recorded at Olympic Sound Studios